Alien Abduction (also known under the working title of The Morris Family Abduction) is a 2014 American found-footage science fiction horror film and the directorial debut of Matty Beckerman. The movie was released to VOD on April 4, 2014, and also had a limited theatrical run. The film stars Riley Polanski as an autistic 11-year-old boy who records his ordeal as an alien abductee.

Plot
In flash-forward, a figure grabs a camera, revealing a murky corridor with audible human screams. The figure puts the camera in a disposal chute, which opens into space in Earth orbit. The camera falls to Earth where it is later recovered by the U.S. Air Force. Information on-screen then reveals the footage about to be screened is being used as part of Project Blue Book.

Riley Morris, an autistic boy, keeps a video journal while on a family camping trip in Brown Mountain, North Carolina with his father Peter, his mother Katie and his siblings Corey and Jillian. On the last night of their trip, Riley is startled by flashes of light outside of the tent. The children see lights in the sky that promptly vanish.

Driving home the next morning, they are sidetracked when their GPS mysteriously misdirects them to an isolated route. They lose their cellphone signals and the car runs low on gas. A crow unexpectedly falls besides the car, dead.

They reach a tunnel and see it is blocked with recently-abandoned vehicles. Peter, Corey and Riley leave their car to investigate while Katie stays behind with Jillian. Personal belongings are scattered around some of the cars and it appears the missing occupants were forcefully removed from their vehicles. Peter sees a humanoid silhouette at the end of the tunnel and calls out. Upon realizing the approaching figure is not human, Peter tells the boys to run. He is engulfed in light and convulses before disappearing.

The boys reunite with Katie and Jillian. A murder of crows falls on their car, which shuts down. They hear a blaring sound and flee to a cabin they passed earlier. The cabin's owner, Sean, is a rustic recluse who is initially hostile towards the family. He changes his mind when he hears his guard dog being attacked by something that followed them from the tunnel. Sean and the family barricade themselves for the evening. Sean says that the Brown Mountain Lights and abductions have been a local recurrence for centuries. Upon hearing a radio message from his missing brother, Sean leaves.

The cabin is eventually breached and in an effort to save his family, Corey hides the others in the cellar, blocking the door. Alien beings enter and abduct him. The remaining members of the family are soon saved by a returned Sean who takes them to his truck, planning to take them back to town down the mountain. The aliens find them and Sean tells them to head to a nearby barn and take refuge. Sean catches up with them and the group attempt to leave the barn. Katie and Sean are then abducted. Riley and Jillian take refuge deep in the woods for the night, with the aliens closeby.

Climbing down the mountain at dawn, they see a town in the valley below and soon find a road. Hopes are dashed when it leads back to the tunnel where their father was abducted. Jillian collapses in despair, at the same moment a police car arrives. The aliens arrive and abduct the policeman, Jillian, and Riley, who is still clinging to the camera. The remaining footage shows a rapid ascension into orbit, before cutting to the footage from the beginning of the film. Two men in respirators and Hazmat suits are seen taking the camera away in a U.S. Air Force van.

In a mid-credits scene, one year later a North Carolina state trooper finds Peter huddled on a bridge, naked, dishevelled and in a state of shock. The fate of the rest of the family is uncertain, though comments made by the police officer on his radio suggest that Peter is not the only member of the family to have been found.

Cast
Katherine Sigismund as Katie Morris
Corey Eid as Corey Morris
Riley Polanski as Riley Morris
Jillian Clare as Jillian Morris
Jeff Bowser as Sean
Peter Holden as Peter Morris
Jordan Turchin as Officer James
Kelley Hinman as Park Ranger

Production
Beckerman was inspired to create Alien Abduction while he was living in North Carolina and heard a local legend about how strange lights had been seen on a nearby mountain ridge and that people claimed to have been abducted while viewing them. He also drew inspiration from director Alfred Hitchcock and included a scene of several dozen birds as tribute to him. While working on the basic script, Beckerman and scriptwriter Robert Lewis wanted to have a valid rationale for Riley to continue filming even when things became dangerous, and they decided to use it as a coping mechanism for Riley after a psychologist informed Beckerman that he had previously treated an autistic child who videotaped everything that he did. Lewis completed the script prior to filming, but Beckerman chose to allow the actors to ad-lib their lines as a way of allowing them to get into character more easily. Filming took place in North Carolina in Burke County, Avery County, Watauga County, and Bryson City.

Reception
On review aggregator Rotten Tomatoes, the film holds an approval rating of 28%, based on 18 reviews with an average rating of 4.4/10. Metacritic gives the film a weighted average score of 46 out of 100, based on 10 critics, indicating "mixed or average reviews".

Common praise for the film centered upon Riley's use of his camcorder as a coping mechanism for an autistic boy, as reviewers felt that it gave a good rationale for Riley to continue filming "when any sane person would stop shooting and start running". Criticism for the movie centered upon what the reviewers saw as an overly generic plotline and an overabundance of jump scares.

References

External links
 

2014 films
2014 horror films
Alien abduction films
Found footage films
American science fiction horror films
2010s science fiction horror films
Films about autism
Films set in North Carolina
Films shot in North Carolina
2014 directorial debut films
2010s English-language films
2010s American films